Xanthophyllum adenotus is a plant in the family Polygalaceae. The specific epithet  is from the Greek meaning "gland", referring to the leaf glands.

Description
The flowers are pinkish to pale violet, drying dark red.

Distribution and habitat
Xanthophyllum adenotus grows naturally in Sumatra and Borneo. Its habitat is mixed dipterocarp forests from sea-level to  altitude.

Varieties
One variety is currently recognised:
X. adenotus var. arsatii

References

adenotus
Flora of Sumatra
Flora of Borneo
Plants described in 1861
Taxa named by Friedrich Anton Wilhelm Miquel